Brachyspira aalborgi is a species of bacteria, one of the causative agents of intestinal spirochetosis. Its cells are anaerobic, sigmoidal with tapered ends, 2 to 6 µm long. Four flagella are inserted at each end of the cells. The maximal cell width is about 0.2 µm. The type strain is 513A (NCTC 11492).

References

Further reading

External links
LSPN Bacterio.net

Spirochaetes
Bacteria described in 1982